Torbjörn Flygt (born 1964) is a Swedish novelist. He made his literary debut in 1995 with the novel Längsta ögonblicket. Among his other novels is Män vid kusten from 1997. He was awarded the August Prize in 2001 for the novel Underdog, a story set in Malmö.

References

1964 births
Living people
20th-century Swedish novelists
August Prize winners
Swedish male novelists
21st-century Swedish novelists